Atrophic gastritis  is a process of chronic inflammation of the gastric mucosa of the stomach, leading to a loss of gastric glandular cells and their eventual replacement by intestinal and fibrous tissues. As a result, the stomach's secretion of essential substances such as hydrochloric acid, pepsin, and intrinsic factor is impaired, leading to digestive problems. The most common are vitamin B12 deficiency possibly leading to pernicious anemia; and malabsorption of iron, leading to iron deficiency anaemia. It can be caused by persistent infection with Helicobacter pylori, or can be autoimmune in origin. Those with autoimmune atrophic gastritis (Type A gastritis) are statistically more likely to develop gastric carcinoma, Hashimoto's thyroiditis, and achlorhydria.

Type A gastritis primarily affects the fundus (body) of the stomach and is more common with pernicious anemia. Type B gastritis primarily affects the antrum, and is more common with H. pylori infection.

Signs and symptoms
Some people with atrophic gastritis may be asymptomatic. That said, symptomatic patients are mostly females and signs of atrophic gastritis are those associated with iron deficiency: fatigue, restless legs syndrome, brittle nails, hair loss, impaired immune function, and impaired wound healing. And other symptoms, such as delayed gastric emptying (80%), reflux symptoms (25%), peripheral neuropathy (25% cases), autonomic abnormalities, and memory loss, are less common and occur in 1%–2% of cases. Other psychiatric disorders are also reported, such as mania, depression, obsessive compulsive disorder, psychosis and cognitive impairment.

Although, autoimmune atrophic gastritis impairs iron and vitamin B12 absorption, iron deficiency will be found at a younger age and many years before the development of pernicious anemia.

Associated conditions
People with atrophic gastritis are also at increased risk for the development of gastric adenocarcinoma.

Causes
Recent research has shown that autoimmune metaplastic atrophic gastritis (AMAG) is a result of the immune system attacking the parietal cells.

Environmental metaplastic atrophic gastritis (EMAG) is due to environmental factors, such as diet and H. pylori infection. EMAG is typically confined to the body of the stomach. Patients with EMAG are also at increased risk of gastric carcinoma.

Pathophysiology

Autoimmune metaplastic atrophic gastritis (AMAG) is an inherited form of atrophic gastritis characterized by an immune response directed toward parietal cells and intrinsic factor. The presence of serum antibodies to parietal cells and to intrinsic factor are characteristic findings. The autoimmune response subsequently leads to the destruction of parietal cells, which leads to profound Achlorhydria (and elevated gastrin levels). The inadequate production of intrinsic factor also leads to vitamin B12 malabsorption and pernicious anemia. AMAG is typically confined to the gastric body and fundus.

Achlorhydria induces G cell (gastrin-producing) hyperplasia, which leads to hypergastrinemia. Gastrin exerts a trophic effect on enterochromaffin-like cells (ECL cells are responsible for histamine secretion) and is hypothesized to be one mechanism to explain the malignant transformation of ECL cells into carcinoid tumors in AMAG.

Diagnosis
Detection of APCA(Antiparietal cell antibody), anti-intrinsic factor antibody (AIFA) and Helicobacter pylori (HP) antibodies in conjunction with serum gastrin are effective for diagnostic purposes.

Classification
The notion that atrophic gastritis could be classified depending on the level of progress as "closed type" or "open type" was  suggested in early studies, but no universally accepted classification exists as of 2017.

Treatment
Supplementation of folic acid in deficient patients can improve the histopathological findings of chronic atrophic gastritis and reduce the incidence of gastric cancer.

See also
 Chronic gastritis

References

External links 

Aging-associated diseases
Autoimmune diseases
Stomach disorders